William Frederick Jolitz (February 22, 1957 – March 2, 2022), commonly known as Bill Jolitz, was an American software engineer best known for developing the 386BSD operating system from 1989 to 1994 along with his wife Lynne Jolitz.

Before 386BSD, Bill Jolitz designed the Symmetric 375 with an NSC 16032 (NS32000) CPU running 4.2BSD. His own Symmetric Computer Systems sold them from 1987 until 1988.

Jolitz received his BA in Computer Science from UC Berkeley.

He and his wife resided in Los Gatos, California.

On March 2, 2022, Jolitz died from sarcoma. His death was announced on April 8, 2022, on The Unix Heritage Society (TUHS) mailing list.

References

External links
  - personal website
  article

1957 births
2022 deaths
BSD people
Free software programmers
People from Muskegon, Michigan
University of California, Berkeley alumni